La Crónica de Hoy is a Mexican newspaper published in Mexico City. The newspaper was launched in 1996 by its founder, Pablo Hiriart. La Crónica de Hoy has been directed by journalist Guillermo Ortega Ruiz since 2007.

See also
 List of newspapers in Mexico

References

External links

1996 establishments in Mexico
Newspapers published in Mexico City
Newspapers established in 1996
Spanish-language newspapers